iPhone OS 1 (officially: iPhone Software; unofficially retronym: iOS 1), is the first major release of iOS, Apple's mobile operating system. No official name was given on its initial release; Apple marketing literature simply stated that the iPhone runs a version of Apple's desktop operating system, OS X (later known as macOS). On March 6, 2008, with the release of the iPhone software development kit (iPhone SDK), Apple named it iPhone OS. It was succeeded by iPhone OS 2 on July 11, 2008.

History

Development history 
Development of iPhone OS 1 and the first generation of iPhone Hardware was a combined effort.  Only employees from within Apple were allowed to be a part of the iPhone development team. It was a completely secret project and at the time when the team was selected, even they weren't told what they were going to be working on. There were two teams inside Apple that worked on creating the iPhone: one worked on converting the iPod into a phone and the other worked on compressing the Mac OS X to make it work on smaller devices like phones. A team led by Jon Rubinstein worked on developing a lightweight Linux-based version, commonly referred to as Acorn, while another team led by Scott Forstall worked on developing a more compressed and streamlined version of the Mac OS X, codenamed purple, to run on the ARM chipset. Tony Fadell, who then led the iPhone team said "It was a competing set of ideas, not teams, and we were all working on it" There were 16 to 17 different concepts. Many people on the team were still hung up on the idea that everyone would want to type on a hardware keyboard, not glass. The idea of introducing a complete touch screen was very novel to everyone. Many user interfaces were prototyped, including the multi-touch click-wheel. Although many thought it was a waste of time, Apple CEO Steve Jobs insisted on prototyping all concepts/ideas before the Mac OS-X-based version of the operating system was selected.

Introduction and initial release 
iPhone OS 1 was introduced at the Macworld Conference & Expo at the Moscone Convention Center in San Francisco, with keynote address by Steve Jobs on January 9, 2007, along with the original iPhone.  At the time, Jobs only said the iPhone ran "OS X".

iPhone OS 1.0 was released, alongside the iPhone, on June 29, 2007.

Apps

Built-in applications 

 Text (iPhone only)
 Calendar
 Photos
 Camera (iPhone only)
 YouTube
 Stocks
 Maps
 Weather
 Clock
 Calculator
 Notes
 Settings
 iTunes
 Phone (iPhone only)
 Music (iPod Touch exclusive)
 Videos (iPod Touch exclusive)
 Mail
 Safari
 iPod (iPhone only)

Third-party applications 
iPhone OS 1 did not have the App Store or a Software Development Kit (SDK) for third-party developers to create native applications. Instead, Apple directed developers to create web apps which could be accessed from Safari.

Supported devices 
iPhone (1st generation)
iPod Touch (1st generation)

Version history

References

External links 
 

1
2007 software
Products introduced in 2007
Mobile operating systems
Proprietary operating systems